Khalid Mehmood (born 6 February 1969) is a Pakistani cricket umpire. He has stood in matches in several domestic tournaments in Pakistan, including the 2015–16 Quaid-e-Azam Trophy and the 2015–16 Haier T20 Cup. He has also stood in Women's One Day International cricket matches. Outside of Pakistan he has stood in matches in the 2016–17 Bangladesh Premier League.

In December 2017, he was one of the on-field umpires for the final of the 2017–18 Quaid-e-Azam Trophy.

References

External links
 

1969 births
Living people
Pakistani cricket umpires
Place of birth missing (living people)